PV Narasimha Rao Marg (PVNR Marg), formerly Necklace Road is a boulevard in Hyderabad, Telangana, adjoining the Hussain Sagar lake, which connects NTR Gardens to Sanjeevaiah Park. It is named after the first and the famous Necklace Road in Mumbai's Marine Drive. The road from Sanjivaiah park connects to the Tankbund road which in turn connects to the NTR Gardens completing a circle. This stretch of road, along with the Tank Bund, appears in the form of a necklace as seen from the sky - and hence the name.

This boulevard is complete with restaurants, recreational facilities and good views of the city of Hyderabad. People's plaza, located on this boulevard is a recreational area which is busy all throughout the year with exhibitions, music shows, sports and games etc. Eat Street and Water Front are two well known restaurants, the latter which offers more of buffets and a variety of cuisines, whereas the former is more of a fast food joint. Both offer a view of the lake along with the city.

This boulevard connects to nearby parks such as Jogi bear park, Sanjivaiah park and Jalavihar. Both these parks provide open spaces and  calm environment. This boulevard is frequented by early morning joggers, marathon events, and evening hangouts. The Necklace Road MMTS Station is the closest rapid transit facility available connecting to all major parts of the city.

Gallery

References

External links

Telangana Tourism feature

Roads in Hyderabad, India
Boulevards
Tourist attractions in Hyderabad, India